1,3-Dichloropropane is a compound of chlorine, hydrogen, and carbon.  It may  be found as a contaminant in soil fumigants containing 1,3-dichloropropene.  It has low acute toxicity.

References

Chloroalkanes